Surahmat bin Suwoto Wijoyo  (born 11 May 1988) is an Indonesian weightlifter. Competing in the 56 kg body weight division he won silver medals at the 2011 Summer Universiade and 2017 Southeast Asian Games, and a bronze medal at the 2018 Asian Games.

References

1988 births
Living people
Indonesian male weightlifters
Southeast Asian Games silver medalists for Indonesia
Asian Games bronze medalists for Indonesia
Asian Games medalists in weightlifting
People from Blora Regency
Sportspeople from Central Java
Weightlifters at the 2014 Asian Games
Weightlifters at the 2018 Asian Games
Medalists at the 2018 Asian Games
Competitors at the 2017 Southeast Asian Games
Universiade silver medalists for Indonesia
Universiade medalists in weightlifting
Southeast Asian Games medalists in weightlifting
Competitors at the 2019 Southeast Asian Games
Southeast Asian Games bronze medalists for Indonesia
Islamic Solidarity Games medalists in weightlifting
Islamic Solidarity Games competitors for Indonesia
21st-century Indonesian people